Nocaima is a municipality and town of Colombia in the department of Cundinamarca. It is the oldest settlement in Colombia, and therefore of historical significance. Founded on June 8, 1605, it sits in the hills of the Andes, about 60 km outside Bogota, the current Capital of Colombia.

The official municipal website of Nocaima is found under
http://nocaima-cundinamarca.gov.co/sitio.shtml

Municipalities of Cundinamarca Department
1605 establishments in the Spanish Empire
Populated places established in 1605